The first European contact in 1492 started an influx of communicable diseases into the Caribbean. Diseases originating in the Old World (Afro-Eurasia) came to the New World (the Americas) for the first time, resulting in demographic and sociopolitical changes due to the Columbian Exchange from the late 15th century onwards. The Indigenous peoples of the Americas had little immunity to the predominantly European diseases, resulting in significant loss of life and contributing to their enslavement and exploitation perpetrated by the European colonists. Waves of enslaved Africans were brought to replace the dwindling Indigenous populations, solidifying the position of disease in triangular trade.

Infectious diseases 

Before the first wave of European colonization, the Indigenous peoples of the Americas and the Caribbean are thought to have lived with infrequent epidemic diseases, brought about by limited contact between tribes. This left them socially and biologically unprepared when the Italian explorer Christopher Columbus and his crew introduced several infectious diseases, including typhus, smallpox, influenza, whooping cough, and measles following his 1492 voyage to the Americas. The European diseases spread from the carriers to the Indigenous populations, who had no immunity, leading to more serious cases and higher mortality. Because the Indigenous societies of the Americas were not used to the diseases as European nations were at the time, there was no system in place to care for the sick.

Smallpox is among the most notable of diseases in the Columbian Exchange due to the high number of deaths and impact on life for Indigenous societies. Smallpox first broke out in the Americas on the island of  Hispaniola in 1518. The disease was carried over from Europe, where it had been endemic for over seven hundred years. Like the other diseases introduced in the time period, the Europeans were familiar with the treatment of the disease and had some natural immunity, which reduced mortality and facilitated quicker recovery. The Taíno people, who inhabited Hispaniola, had no natural smallpox immunity and were unfamiliar with treating epidemic disease.

In 1493, the first recorded influenza epidemic to strike the Americas occurred on the island of Hispaniola in the northern Spanish settlement of Isabela. The virus was introduced to the Isle of Santo Domingo by the Cristóbal Cólon, which docked at La Isabela on 10 December 1493, carrying about 2,000 Spanish passengers. Despite the general poor health of the colony, Columbus returned in 1494 and found that the Native American population had been affected by disease even more catastrophically than Isabela's first settlers were. By 1506, only a third of the native population remained. The Taíno population before European contact is estimated to have been between 60,000 and 8 million people, and the entire nation was virtually extinct 50 years after contact, which has primarily been attributed to the infectious diseases.

After the first European contact, social disruption and epidemic diseases led to a decline in the Amerindian population. Because the Indigenous societies, including the Taínos, were unfamiliar with the diseases, they were not prepared to deal with the social consequences. The high number of people incapacitated by the disease disrupted the normal cycles of agriculture and hunting that sustained the Native American populations. This led to increased dependence on the Europeans, and reduced capacity to resist the European invasion. The eventual enslavement of the Taíno people by the Europeans compounded the effects of the epidemics in the downfall of the Indigenous societies.

Impact of the transatlantic slave trade 

As the population of enslaved Indigenous peoples fell due to disease and abuse, the Spanish and Portuguese conquistadors began to import enslaved workers from Africa in 1505. Until 1800 the population rose as slaves arrived from West Africa. Because there was already an established European colonial presence in Africa at the time, the enslaved Africans were less vulnerable to disease than the Taíno people on Hispanola. However, they came carrying their own diseases, including malaria. At the time, malaria was endemic both in Europe and Africa, though more prevalent in the latter continent. The climate of the Caribbean was hospitable to mosquitoes of the genus Anopheles, which acts as a vector for the disease and allowed it to spread. Many of the African-born enslaved people had genetic protections against malaria that Indigenous enslaved people did not. As malaria, smallpox, and other diseases spread the Indigenous populations continued to fall, which increased the motivation for the Spanish and Portuguese colonists to continue to import more enslaved workers from Africa. This enslaved people worked in mining and agriculture, driving the development of triangular trade.

See also 
 Catholic Church and the Age of Discovery
 Columbian Exchange
 HIV/AIDS in the Caribbean
 Malaria and the Caribbean
 Native American disease and epidemics
 Seasoning (colonialism)
 Timeline of European imperialism
 Triangular trade
 Virgin soil epidemic

References

Bibliography 
 Engerman, Stanley L. "A Population History of the Caribbean", pp. 483–528 in A Population History of North America Michael R. Haines and Richard Hall Steckel (Eds.), Cambridge University Press, 2000, .

1490s in the Caribbean
15th-century epidemics
16th-century epidemics
17th-century epidemics
18th-century epidemics
African slave trade
Age of Discovery
Disease transmission
Epidemiology
European colonization of the Caribbean
Health in the Caribbean
History of Hispaniola
History of indigenous peoples of North America
History of indigenous peoples of the Americas
History of the Caribbean
History of the Colony of Santo Domingo
Indigenous health
Portuguese colonization of the Americas
Spanish colonization of the Americas